The Mask of Cthulhu is a collection of fantasy and horror short stories by American writer August Derleth. It was released in 1958 by Arkham House in an edition of 2,051 copies.

The stories are part of the Cthulhu Mythos and most had appeared in the magazine Weird Tales between 1939 and 1953.

Contents

The Mask of Cthulhu contains the following tales:

 "Introduction"
 "The Return of Hastur"
 "The Whippoorwills in the Hills"
 "Something in Wood"
 "The Sandwin Compact"
 "The House in the Valley"
 "The Seal of R'lyeh"

Sources 

1958 short story collections
Cthulhu Mythos anthologies
Fantasy short story collections
Horror short story collections
Arkham House books